Ku Chang-mo (Hangul: 구창모; born May 31, 1994), known mononymously as  Changmo (창모; stylized in all caps), is a South Korean rapper and producer. He released his debut album M O T O W N on March 18, 2016. In October 2016 he joined Dok2 and The Quiett's sub-label, Ambition Musik.

Personal life
Changmo was accepted into Berklee College of Music twice, having applied once when he was 18, and once when he was 19. However, as he could not obtain a scholarship on both occasions, he chose not to attend.

Changmo enlisted in the army for his mandatory military enlistment on March 14, 2022.

Discography

Mixtapes

Studio albums

Extended plays

Singles

Other charted songs

Awards and nominations

Notes

References

External links
 

1994 births
Living people
South Korean male rappers
South Korean hip hop singers
21st-century South Korean male singers